The 1966–68 Liga Alef season saw Hapoel Kfar Saba (champions of the North Division) and Beitar Jerusalem (champions of the South Division) win the title and promotion to Liga Leumit.

North Division

South Division

See also
1966–68 Liga Leumit

References
Kfar Shalem, Beitar Kiryat Ono, Nahariya and Safed - to Liga Bet Maariv, 21.4.68, Historical Jewish Press 
Previous seasons The Israel Football Association 

Liga Alef seasons
Israel
2
Israel
2